David Meme is primarily known as a producer and musician currently living and working in Brighton. As well as recording under the moniker Meme he is also one half of the electronic music duo Ward. He co-founded the open source label Loca Records, with graphic designer Marcus McCallion in 1999. Meme has been played by John Peel on his John Peel Show on BBC Radio 1 a number of times as both Meme and as another project, Ward (with co-musician Richard Williams from Birmingham band Calvados Beam Trio). His latest project is ØxØ with Barnaby Thorn, released on Truant Recordings in 2019.

Discography as Meme

Albums 
 Eudaimonia Loca Records (2001)
 Affectivity Loca Records (2003)

Singles and Extended Players 
 Kinematic EP Loca Records (1999)
 Mandibles EP Loca Records (2001)

Collaborations 
 Invisible Meme & Tome, Mirrordisc Records (2001)
 24 EP Meme versus Xan, Loca Records (2004)
 mythologies EP ØxØ, [Truant Recordings] (2019)

Compilations 
 1971 WIAIWYA Records.

Discography as Ward

Albums 
 It's Not Necessarily Your Height It Could Be Your Feet Loca Records (2002)
 It Might Be Useful For Us To Know Loca Records (2005)

Singles and Extended Players 
 Sesquipedalian Origins Static Caravan Recordings (2002)
 De Fernius/Armonica or Something Static Caravan Recordings (2004)

Compilations 
 C, Ward. 1 Minute. WIAIWYA Records.

See also
Open source record label

References

External links
 ØxØ Discuss the Big, Post-Digital Ideas Behind Their Debut EP
 Loca Records – an Open Source Record Label
 Publicity photo of David Meme
 Svenska Dagbladet Newspaper Interview with David Meme
 Interview in Sound on Sound article on Copyleft licensing
 Interview – fr 1st, en below – in Dogmazic.net on music, Loca, copyleft & libre music
 David Meme's latest project St Hanshaugen

English electronic musicians
Year of birth missing (living people)
Living people